The red side-necked turtle (Rhinemys rufipes), red turtle, red-footed sideneck turtle, William's toadhead turtle, or red-footed Amazon side-necked turtle is a monotypic species of turtle in the family Chelidae. It is found in Colombia and possibly Peru and Brazil. This species is dimorphic in size meaning the sexes show different characteristics. One study found that the largest female out of a group of 24 was 256 mm in carapace length. Out of that same group, the largest male was only 199 mm in carapace length. A study focused on determining how these turtles acquire their sex discovered that it is not environmentally determined rather, it is a genetic sex determination.

References

Rhinemys
Turtles of South America
Fauna of the Amazon
Reptiles of Colombia
Reptiles described in 1824
Taxonomy articles created by Polbot